The 1854 Waimea by-election was a by-election held in the multi-member electorate of  during the 1st New Zealand Parliament, on 21 June 1854, and was the second by-election in New Zealand political history (and the first contested by-election), coming two days after the Town of Nelson by-election.

The Waimea member of parliament William Cautley and the neighbouring  electorate's MP  William Travers both resigned on 26 May 1854, two days after the start of the first Parliamentary session of the 1st New Zealand Parliament. On nomination day (20 June) William Travers and Francis Jollie were nominated (Jollie was nominated in absentia), and after a show of hands in favour of Jollie, Travers demanded a poll. William Travers was subsequently elected the following day.

Run up to the election
Up to 17 June 1854 it was unknown in the public that multiple candidates would seek nomination by the electors; Francis Jollie was thought to be the only candidate. On that date William Travers, who had resigned from the Town of Nelson electorate on the same date as Cautley, announced his candidacy.

Nomination meeting
The nomination meeting was held on 20 June 1854 in Richmond, with the polling date set for 21 June. There was a reasonable number of electors present. The Returning Officer then read the writ. F. Otterson proposed Francis Jollie, as expected, seconded by Mr. Harkness. J. W. Saxton said he was happy to propose Mr. William L. T. Travers, a nomination seconded by S. Wells.
A show of hands then happened after speeches, which was declared in favour of Jollie, to which Travers demanded a poll.

Election

References

Waimea 1854
1854 elections in New Zealand
Politics of the Nelson Region
Politics of the Marlborough Region